Dante Carnesecchi (1892–1921) was an Italian individualist anarchist.

References 

1892 births
1921 deaths
Egoist anarchists
Italian anarchists
Futurist writers
People from the Province of La Spezia
Individualist anarchists

Murdered anarchists